Abd al-Azim al-Hasani who is commonly known as Shah Abdol-Azim and likewise Sayyid al-Karim, is among those scholars who are from the progeny of the second Imam of Shia Islam, Hasan ibn Ali. His complete name is Abu al-Qasim ‘Abd al-Azim bin ‘Abdillah bin ‘Ali bin al-Hasan bin Zayd (bin ‘Ali) bin al-Hasan bin ‘Ali bin Abi Talib.

Abd al-Azim who is also named as Hazrat Abd al-Azim Hasani particularly in formal speaking/news; and he was a hadith transmitter. Ibn Babawayh has compiled the Islamic narrations transmitted by Abd al-Azim in a collection which is famous as Jami'-al-Akhbar Abd al-Azim.

Abd al-Azim, whose Kunyas are Abul-Qasim and Abol-Fath was among the companions of the ninth and tenth Imams of Shia, namely Muhammad al-Jawad and Ali al-Hadi. Besides, according to Rijal al-Tusi, Abd al-Azim has been among the companions of the eleventh Imam of Shia, Hasan al-Askari, too. He died on November 2, 866, and is buried at the Shah Abdol-Azim Shrine in Rey, Iran. Seyyed Ali Qazi Askar is the new patron saint of the shrine of Abdolazim Hassani, who was appointed to this position by the Supreme Leader of the Islamic Republic of Iran, Seyyed Ali Khamenei -- on 27 March 2022.

See also
 Holiest sites in Islam (Shia)
 Ali Qazi Askar, the (new) appointed custodian of the shrine of "Abd al-Azim al-Hasani"

References

Further reading
 
 
 

Shia shrines
Shia imams
Shia Islam
National works of Iran
866 deaths
Year of birth unknown